Mike McCarthy is an American politician who has served in the Vermont House of Representatives since 2012.

References

External links

Living people
1984 births
21st-century American politicians
Democratic Party members of the Vermont House of Representatives
Saint Michael's College alumni
People from Lewes, Delaware